Agamyxis albomaculatus is an omnivorous species of thorny catfish endemic to the Orinoco River in Venezuela.  This species grows to a length of  SL. This species is found in the aquarium trade, but is less frequent than the similar and closely relative Agamyxis pectinifrons. Although the common name spotted raphael catfish most often refers to that species, it is occasionally used for Agamyxis albomaculatus.

References

Doradidae
Fish of South America
Taxa named by Wilhelm Peters
Fish described in 1877